B. V. R. Mohan Reddy (born 1950) is an Indian business executive and engineering manager who founded and served as Executive Chairman of Cyient.  He joined the DCM Group in 1974, and has subsequently worked with MICO Bosch, HCL, and OMC Computers Limited. He was the Chairman of NASSCOM from 2014–2015, and is a prolific business analyst.

Early life and education
BVR Mohan Reddy was born on 12 October 1950 in Mahbubnagar, Mahbubnagar District, Telangana . Mohan holds a graduate degree in Mechanical engineering from the College of Engineering, Kakinada, India, and postgraduate degrees from the Indian Institute of Technology, Kanpur and the University of Michigan. He has also received an honorary Ph.D. from the Jawaharlal Nehru Technological University, Hyderabad; an honorary D.Sc. from the Andhra University, Vishakhapatnam; and Doctor of Science Honoris Causa from KL University (Koneru Lakshmaiah Education Foundation), Vaddesaram.

Career
Mohan started his career with the DCM group (Shiram Refrigeration), where he contributed to the assembly line operations in Diesel Engine production. After leaving the DCM group, he worked with MICO Bosch and then HCL , before joining OMC computers as Managing Director. Mohan founded Cyient as Infotech Enterprises in 1991, and he currently serves as the executive chairman of the company.

He has also been a member of the NASSCOM Executive Council since 2003 and served as the Chairman of the Confederation of Indian Industry (CII), southern region (2008-2009). He is associated with councils of various academic and industry forums and has led several initiatives to help industrial companies evolve and grow. Reddy also serves as Chairman, Board of Governors of IIT Roorkee; member on the Board of NIIT University, Neemrana; and member of Centre for Innovation and Entrepreneurship at IIIT Hyderabad.

Awards
Hyderabad Management Association awarded him the "Entrepreneur of the year" for 1992
HYSEA Outstanding Contribution Award in 1997
Ernst & Young presented him the " Outstanding Entrepreneur Award" in 1999
ASME Leadership Award 
Honorary Doctorate - JNTU, Hyderabad
Distinguished Alumni Award - IIT, Kanpur
Hyderabad Management Association awarded him the "Life Time Achievement Award" for the year 2015 
Padma Shri award 2017 in Trade & Industry.

Honors
Former Chairman NASSCOM
Vice Chairman NASSCOM
Chairman, Board of Governors, IIT Hyderabad
President of Electronic Industries Association of Andhra Pradesh (ELIAP)
President of Hyderabad Software Exporters Association (HYSEA)
Vice Chairman of the CII-AP Chapter.
Chairman of CII (AP State Council)

References

Businesspeople in software
Living people
Telugu people
Andhra University alumni
University of Michigan alumni
IIT Kanpur alumni
Indian industrialists
1950 births
Businesspeople from Andhra Pradesh
Indian philanthropists
Indian business executives
Indian Internet company founders
Indian technology company founders